Highwood is a provincial electoral district in southern Alberta, Canada. The district is one of 87 in the province mandated to return a single member to the Legislative Assembly of Alberta using the first past the post method of voting.

The district was created in the 1971 boundary redistribution out of the old Okotoks-High River riding and the North part of Pincher Creek-Crowsnest. The district has favoured right leaning parties since its creation. Progressive Conservative Association of Alberta candidates held the district from 1975 until 2012 when they were unseated by the Wildrose Party.

The current representative is RJ Sigurdson, who was first elected in 2019.

History
The electoral district of Highwood was created in the 1971 boundary redistribution from the old electoral districts of Okotoks-High River and Pincher Creek-Crowsnest.

The 2010 boundary redistribution saw the riding cut down in size. Land south of the town of High River and a portion of land in the northwest of the constituency was transferred to the Livingstone-Macleod riding. A portion of land in the north east was also transferred to the Little Bow riding. The boundary commission had intended to rename Highwood to bring back the Okotoks-High River name but it was quashed in an amendment to the redistribution bill in the Legislative Assembly.

The 2017 redistribution saw more of Highwood transferred to Livingstone-Macleod, this time the entire community of High River. However, the riding expanded westward, now including the town of Black Diamond. The Boundaries Commission renamed the riding Okotoks-Sheep River in their final report, but the Legislative Assembly again chose to retain the name Highwood.

Boundary history

Representation history

The electoral district was created in the 1971 boundary redistribution. The first election held that year saw Okotoks-High River incumbent Social Credit MLA Edward Benoit win a very closely contested race to pick up the new seat for his party.

Benoit was defeated in the 1975 election by Progressive Conservative candidate George Wolstenholme. He was re-elected to his second term in the 1979 general election and retired at dissolution of the Legislature in 1982.

The 1982 election garnered great interest as incumbent Western Canada Concept MLA Gordon Kesler tried to win re-election here after winning a by-election is his former riding of Olds-Didsbury. Progressive Conservative candidate Harry Alger defeated Kesler in a landslide. Kesler had originally promised to move into the Olds-Didsbury riding after winning election and had reneged on that promise.

Alger won his second term in the 1986 general election defeating five other candidates. He retired from provincial politics at dissolution of the legislature in 1989. His replacement was Progressive Conservative candidate Don Tannas who won election for the first time that year.

Tannas won re-election three times in the 1993, 1997 and 2001 general elections with increasing majorities every time. He retired from provincial politics at dissolution of the legislature in 2004.

The 2004 general election saw Progressive Conservative candidate George Groeneveld elected MLA. He was appointed to cabinet in 2006 as the Minister of Agriculture by Premier Ed Stelmach. In the 2008 general election he won a landslide majority. In early 2010 Groeneveld was shuffled out of cabinet and returned to the back benches.

The 2012 general election saw the riding returned to opposition control for the first time since 1975 when Wildrose leader Danielle Smith won the open seat, winning her first term in office and becoming Leader of the Official Opposition. However, after Jim Prentice took control of the governing PCs, she and most of her caucus crossed the floor to his party in 2014.

Despite Smith's high profile, she failed to win the PC nomination to stand as the party's candidate in Highwood for the 2015 election. Wildrose re-gained the seat, with Wayne Anderson becoming the new MLA. He subsequently joined the United Conservative Party when the PCs and Wildrose decided to merge.

Legislature results

1971 general election

1975 general election

1979 general election

1982 general election

1986 general election

1989 general election

1993 general election

1997 general election

2001 general election

2004 general election

2008 general election

2012 general election

2015 general election

2019 general election

Senate nominee results

2004 Senate nominee election district results
Voters had the option of selecting 4 Candidates on the Ballot

2012 Senate nominee election district results

Student Vote results

2004 election

On November 19, 2004 a Student Vote was conducted at participating Alberta schools to parallel the 2004 Alberta general election results. The vote was designed to educate students and simulate the electoral process for persons who have not yet reached the legal majority. The vote was conducted in 80 of the 83 provincial electoral districts with students voting for actual election candidates. Schools with a large student body that reside in another electoral district had the option to vote for candidates outside of the electoral district then where they were physically located.

2012 election

References

External links
Website of the Legislative Assembly of Alberta

Alberta provincial electoral districts
High River
Okotoks